The 2002 Benson & Hedges Cup was the final edition of cricket's Benson & Hedges Cup. The competition was won by Warwickshire County Cricket Club. The competition which had been inaugurated in 1972 was scrapped following the government ban on tobacco company sponsorship. The replacement competition the following season would be the new Twenty20 Cup.

Midlands/West/Wales Group

North Group

South Group

Quarter-finals

Semi-finals

Final

References

See also
 Benson & Hedges Cup

2002 in English cricket
Benson & Hedges Cup seasons